SAHS may refer to:

 St Albans High School for Girls in St Albans, Hertfordshire, UK
 St. Anthony High School (disambiguation)
 St. Augustine High School (disambiguation)
 St. Augustine Historical Society, in St Augustine, Florida, United States
 Santa Ana High School, in Orange County, California, US
 Seoul American High School, in South Korea
 Seoul Arts High School, in Seoul, South Korea
 Sunhwa Arts High School, in Seoul, South Korea
 South Albany High School, in Albany, Oregon, United States
 South Anchorage High School, in Anchorage, Alaska, United States
 Stillwater Area High School, Oak Park Heights, Minnesota, United States
 Swiss American Historical Society